Rondo 1 is an office skyscraper with a total height of 192 m located in Warsaw, Poland at Rondo ONZ. The building was designed by Larry Oltmanns during his time as the Design Director for the London office of Skidmore, Owings & Merrill.  Epstein Architecture acted as Executive Architects.  The general contractor was HOCHTIEF Poland.  Oltmanns stated that the design was informed by three aspirations: to create 'an idealised work environment adaptable to a wide range of ways of working; to contribute to a better plan for a liveable city; and to be a symbol of Warsaw's position in a global democratic world.'

Construction began in the spring of 2003; on 7 August 2004 the foundation stone was laid, and 7 March 2006 was the official opening of the building.

See also
 List of tallest buildings in Poland
 List of tallest buildings in Warsaw

References

External links
 Skyscrapers of Warsaw

Office buildings completed in 2006
Śródmieście, Warsaw
Skyscraper office buildings in Warsaw

Skidmore, Owings & Merrill buildings